Ariyannur Umbrellas is a prehistoric Megalith burial site situated in Ariyannur in Kandanassery Panchayat of Thrissur District of Kerala. Archaeological Survey of India in 1951 declared it as  a centrally protected monument. The site has six umbrella stones or mushroom stones, locally called Kudaikkallu. Of them, four are intact and two are partially broken.
.
These are part of the larger Kudakkallu Parambu complex which is believed to be from ~2000 BCE.

Gallery

References

Prehistoric India
History of Kerala
Megalithic monuments
History of Thrissur district
Archaeological sites in Kerala
Monuments of National Importance in Kerala
Tourist attractions in Thrissur district